Eddy Ko Hung (born Ho Yiu-sum ; 1947) is a Hong Kong television and film actor who has worked on the TV stations RTV, ATV (both now defunct), and TVB. Most recently, he has made appearances in several international films including 2015's The Martian.

Background
Ko was born Ho Yiu-sum in Zhongshan in 1947. He started his career in 1968 at the Shaw Brothers Studio and adopted the name Ko Hung as a stage name. Ko joined TVB later and has since acted in many TV drama series. In 1990, Ko joined TVB's rival ATV and worked there until 1995. In 2000, Ko rejoined TVB and continued acting in many TVB-produced drama series. He is also sometimes also credited as Ko Hung, Gao Xiong, Eddie Ko, Edward Ko, and Lin Sheng.

Within the Chinese community, Ko's most remembered performance was in the 1995 version of the television drama Fist of Fury as Huo Yuanjia, the mentor of Chen Zhen. This role led to similar martial arts mentor roles, subsequently.

He migrated his family to Canada and in 1998 co-starred in a role of an illegal immigrant in Lethal Weapon 4, his first international role.

Filmography

Films

Television

References

External links 
 
 HK Cinemagic entry
 Tian Bo Star Agent (Eddy Ko's agent website)

21st-century Hong Kong male actors
Living people
TVB actors
Year of birth uncertain
1937 births
20th-century Hong Kong male actors
Hong Kong male film actors
Hong Kong male television actors
People from Zhongshan